Richard Carey was from Elizabeth City County, Virginia.  He studied law and then practiced in the county courts.  In 1777, he was appointed as a judge of the court of admiralty where he soon became presiding judge.  As a member of that court, he also became a member of the first Court of Appeals.  In 1788, when the Court of Appeals was reorganized and was to have only five judges elected solely for that court, Carey was made a judge on the general court.  He died in 1789.

Justices of the Supreme Court of Virginia
Virginia lawyers
1789 deaths
Year of birth unknown